Hugard's Magic Monthly was a magic periodical published June 1943 – April 1965. The magazine was created and edited by Jean Hugard until his death in 1959, when Fred Braue took over as editor. After Braue's death, the magazine continued to be published by Blanca López until its final issue, number 245. A significant portion of Martin Gardner's Encyclopedia of Impromptu Magic Tricks was originally published in Hugard's Magic Monthly.

References 

Monthly magazines published in the United States
Magic periodicals
Magazines established in 1943
Magazines disestablished in 1965
Magazines published in New York City